Gabriel Raksi (1 November 1938 – 12 April 2002) was a Romanian international football player.

Career
He made his first steps in the football career ever since 1951, joining the team Metalul Oradea (coached by Al. Pop).
The next team he joined was Industria Sârmei Câmpia Turzii, reaching in 1959 to CCA București, after his enrollment. Gheorghe Popescu I, the coach of CCA București team immediately introduced him in the Romanian great team, making his debut on the Republic Stadium, during the game with Progresul București (n.r. 2-1); Gheorghe Popescu I's team comprised the following players: Voinescu, Zavoda II, Apolzan, Ivănescu, Jenei, Bone, Cacoveanu, Raksi, Alecsandrescu, Zavoda I, Tătaru. Raksi remained at Steaua (the designation that Steaua București took in 1962) until 1967.

During his time with Steaua, Raksi played two times for the Romania, 7 times for the national youth and 3 times in the Romania B, as it was practiced then. The team that attacked the qualification to the Rome Olympic Games (1960) when Raksi played against Bulgaria had the following team composition: Voinescu, C.Popa, Karikaș, Soare, Jenei, V.Alexandru, Raksi, Constantin, Hașoti, Dridea, Tătaru.

In 1967 Raksi leaves at order for the ASA Târgu Mureş, being captain in the Romanian Army.
In 1970 when he is put to reserve, Raksi joins the Cotroceni team, Progresul București, where he gains new career satisfactions with: Paul Manta, Viorel Popescu, Jean Grama, Măndoiu, Adrian Constantinescu, Dinu Iordan, Beldeanu, Matei, Dudu Georgescu and Ţarălungă. This was an excellent team that had a remarkable success during the disputes with first hand teams. When Raksi was 36, he plucked up his courage together with another great football player of the banking team, Guţă Iancu, and defends the flag of the Division B team, Metallurgistul Cugir.

A year later (in 1975) Raksi returns to Bucharest as coach of the IMGB București, under the leadership of a great football professional Gheorghe Retezan who was football coach at that time. Between 1976 and 1978 and between 1980 and 1982, Raksi coaches Relonul Săvineşti, another team from Division B, obtaining more than satisfying results.

In 1983, he joins Carpaţi Sinaia, then in 1984 Poiana Câmpina; in 1985 he is with Ştiinţa Drăgăneşti in Division C. Afterwards he joins Unirea Alexandria, and between 1987 and 1989 he reaches Sticla Arieşul Turda, almost the place where he came from in 1959 to join the great team of the Steaua București.

After the 1989 Revolution, Raksi stays in Bucharest and leads teams from stadiums such as Onoare, Voinţa and Granitul, so that in 1993–1994 he makes another stop in Viitorul Chirnogi, a team from Division C.

Honours

Player

Club
Steaua București
Romanian League (2): 1959–60, 1960–61
Romanian Cup (2): 1961–62, 1965–66

Progresul București
Romanian Second League (1): 1969–70

Notes

References

External links

1938 births
2002 deaths
Romanian footballers
Romania international footballers
Olympic footballers of Romania
Liga I players
Liga II players
CSM Câmpia Turzii players
ASA Târgu Mureș (1962) players
FC Progresul București players
FC Steaua București players
Association football forwards
Sportspeople from Oradea